Fraureuth, located in the district of Zwickau, is a small town in Saxony, Germany. It has a population of around 5,000 inhabitants on a surface of 22.59 km². Fraureuth was a component of Thuringia until 1952.

The musicologist Sigrid Neef was born in Fraureuth in 1944.

References

External links

  

Zwickau (district)
Principality of Reuss-Greiz